Philip Holman (c. 1593 – July 1669) was an English merchant and politician who sat in the House of Commons  in 1659.

Holman was a scrivener of London and a member of the Worshipful Company of Grocers. He acquired property at Warkworth, Northamptonshire from the Chetwood family and rebuilt part of the manor house. He became High Sheriff of Northamptonshire in 1638. In 1651 he was elected alderman of the City of London for Walbrook ward and was also elected Sheriff of London.

In 1659, Holman was elected Member of Parliament for Northamptonshire in the Third Protectorate Parliament. 

Holman died at the age of 76 and was buried in the church at Warkworth.

Holman was the father of Sir John Holman, 1st Baronet.

References

1590s births
1669 deaths
English MPs 1659
Year of birth uncertain
Councilmen and Aldermen of the City of London
High Sheriffs of Northamptonshire
High Sheriffs of the County of London
Merchants from the Kingdom of England